The National may refer to:

News media
 The National (TV program), a Canadian Broadcasting Corporation television news program
 The National (Abu Dhabi), a newspaper published in the United Arab Emirates
 The National (Papua New Guinea), a newspaper in Papua New Guinea
 The National (Scotland), a newspaper in Scotland
 The National (Wales), a newspaper in Wales
 The National (Paris), a defunct French newspaper
 The National Sports Daily, a defunct U.S. sports newspaper

Other
 National Theater, Richmond, Virginia, a historic theater in Virginia later renamed as The National
 The National, a biennial exhibition of contemporary Australian art held by the Art Gallery of New South Wales, Carriageworks and the Museum of Contemporary Art Australia in Sydney
 The National (band), an American indie rock band
 The National (album), an album by the band of the same name
 The National, Chicago, a high-rise building in Chicago
 The National (curling), a curling tournament
 The National (golf), a golf tournament
 National Golf Links of America, a golf course in Southampton, New York
 National Football Scouting, an NFL scouting organization

See also
 Grand National (disambiguation)
 Le National (disambiguation)
 National (disambiguation)
 The Nation (disambiguation)